Leroy Eldridge Cleaver (August 31, 1935 – May 1, 1998) was an American writer and political activist who became an early leader of the political organization, Black Panther Party.

In 1968, Cleaver wrote Soul on Ice, a collection of essays that, at the time of its publication, was praised by The New York Times Book Review as "brilliant and revealing". Cleaver stated in Soul on Ice: "If a man like Malcolm X could change and repudiate racism, if I myself and other former Muslims can change, if young whites can change, then there is hope for America."

Cleaver went on to become a prominent member of the Black Panthers, having the titles Minister of Information and Head of the International Section of the Panthers, while a fugitive from the United States criminal justice system in Cuba and Algeria. Cleaver was convicted of a series of crimes including burglary, assault, rape, and attempted murder and eventually served time in Folsom and San Quentin prisons until being released on parole in 1968. In 1968 he became a fugitive after leading an ambush on Oakland police officers, during which two officers were wounded. Cleaver was wounded during the clash and Black Panther member Bobby Hutton was killed. As editor of the official Panthers' newspaper, The Black Panther, Cleaver's influence on the direction of the party was rivaled only by founders Huey P. Newton and Bobby Seale. Cleaver and Newton eventually fell out with each other, resulting in a split that weakened the party.

After spending seven years in exile in Cuba, Algeria, and France, Cleaver returned to the US in 1975, where he became involved in various religious groups (Unification Church and CARP) before joining the Church of Jesus Christ of Latter-day Saints, as well as becoming a conservative Republican, appearing at Republican events.

Biography

Early life
Eldridge Cleaver was born in Wabbaseka, Arkansas. As a child he moved with his large family to Phoenix and then to Los Angeles. He was the son of Leroy Cleaver and Thelma Hattie Robinson. He had four siblings: Wilhelima Marie, Helen Grace, James Weldon, and Theophilus Henry. Both of his grandfathers were Protestant preachers.

As a teenager, he was involved in petty crime and spent time in youth detention centers. At the age of 18, he was convicted of a felony drug charge (marijuana) and sent to the adult prison at Soledad. In 1958, he was convicted of rape and assault with intent to murder, and served time in Folsom and San Quentin prisons. While in prison, he was given a copy of The Communist Manifesto. 

Cleaver was released on parole December 12, 1966, with a discharge date of March 20, 1971. In 1968 he was arrested on violation of parole by association with individual(s) of bad reputation, and control and possession of firearms Cleaver petitioned for habeas corpus to the Solano County Court, and was granted it along with a release of a $50,000 bail.

Black Panther Party

Cleaver was released from prison on December 12, 1966, with the help of Edward Michael Keating, founder of Ramparts magazine. He was writing for Ramparts magazine and organizing efforts to revitalize the Organization of Afro-American Unity. The Black Panther Party (BPP) was only two months old. He then joined the Oakland-based BPP, serving as Minister of Information, or spokesperson. What initially attracted Cleaver to the Panthers, as opposed to other prominent groups, was their commitment to armed struggle.

In 1967, Cleaver, along with Marvin X, Ed Bullins, and Ethna Wyatt, formed the Black House political/cultural center in San Francisco. Amiri Baraka, Sonia Sanchez, Askia Toure, Sarah Webster Fabio, Art Ensemble of Chicago, Avotcja, Reginald Lockett, Emory Douglas, Samuel Napier, Bobby Hutton, Huey Newton, and Bobby Seale were Black House regulars. The same year, he married Kathleen Neal Cleaver (divorced 1987), with whom he would have son Ahmad Maceo Eldridge (born 1969, Algeria; died 2018, Saudi Arabia) and daughter Joju Younghi (born July 31, 1970, North Korea).

Cleaver was a presidential candidate in 1968 on the ticket of the Peace and Freedom Party. Having been born on August 31, 1935, Cleaver would not have been the requisite 35 years of age until more than a year after Inauguration Day 1969. (Although the Constitution requires that the President be at least 35 years of age, it does not specify whether he need have reached that age at the time of nomination, or election, or inauguration.) Courts in both Hawaii and New York held that he could be excluded from the ballot because he could not possibly meet the Constitutional criteria. Cleaver and his running mate Judith Mage received 36,571 votes (0.05%).

In the aftermath of the assassination of Martin Luther King Jr. on April 4, 1968, there were riots across the nation. On April 6, Cleaver and 14 other Panthers were involved in a confrontation with Oakland police officers, during which two of the officers were wounded. Cleaver was wounded during the ambush and 17-year-old Black Panther member Bobby Hutton was killed. They were armed with M16 rifles and shotguns. In 1980, he admitted that he had led the Panther group on a deliberate ambush of the police officers, thus provoking the shootout. 

Some reporters were surprised by this move, because it was in the context of an uncharacteristic speech, in which Cleaver also discredited the Black Panthers, stated "we need police as heroes", and said that he denounced civilian review boards of police shootings for the "bizarre" reason that "it is a rubber stamp for murder". Some speculated Cleaver's admission could have been a pay-off to the Alameda County justice system, whose judge had only just days earlier let him escape prison time; Cleaver was sentenced to community service after getting charged with three counts of assault against three Oakland police officers. The PBS documentary A Huey Newton Story claims that "Bobby Hutton was shot more than twelve times after he had already surrendered and stripped down to his underwear to prove he was not armed."

Charged with attempted murder after the incident, Cleaver jumped bail to flee to Cuba in late 1968. Initially treated with luxury by the Cuban government, the hospitality ended upon reports Fidel Castro had received information of the CIA infiltrating the Black Panther Party. Cleaver then decided to head to Algeria, sending word to his wife to meet him there. Elaine Klein normalized his status by getting him an invitation to attend the Pan-African Cultural festival, rendering him temporarily safe from prosecution.

The festival allowed him to network with revolutionaries from all over Africa in order to discuss the perils of white supremacy and colonialism. Cleaver was outspoken in his call to violence against the United States, contributing to his mission to "position the Panthers within the revolutionary nationalist camp inside the United States and as disciples of Fanon on the world stage". Cleaver had set up an international office for the Black Panthers in Algeria. Following Timothy Leary's Weather Underground-assisted prison escape, Leary stayed with Cleaver in Algiers; however, Cleaver placed Leary under "revolutionary arrest" as a counter-revolutionary for promoting drug use.

Cleaver cultivated an alliance with North Korea in 1969, and BPP publications began reprinting excerpts from Kim Il Sung's writings. Although leftists of the time often looked to Cuba, China, and North Vietnam for inspiration, few had paid any attention to the secretive Pyongyang regime. Bypassing US travel restrictions on North Korea, Cleaver and other BPP members made two visits to North Korea in 1969–1970 with the idea that the juche model could be adapted to the revolutionary liberation of African-Americans. Taken on an official tour of North Korea, Cleaver expressed admiration at "the DPRK's stable, crime-free society which provided guaranteed food, employment, and housing for all, and which had no economic or social inequalities".

Byron Vaughn Booth (former Panther Deputy Minister of Defense) claimed that, after a trip to North Korea, Cleaver discovered that his wife had been having an affair with Clinton Robert Smith Jr. Booth told the FBI he had witnessed Cleaver shoot and kill Smith with an AK47 in Algeria. Elaine Mokhtefi, in the London Review of Books, writes that Cleaver confessed the murder to her shortly after committing it.

In his 1978 book Soul on Fire, Cleaver made several claims regarding his exile in Algeria, including that he was supported by regular stipends from the government of North Vietnam, which the United States was then bombing. Cleaver stated that he was followed by other former criminals turned revolutionaries, many of whom (including Booth and Smith) hijacked planes to get to Algeria.

Split and new directions
Eldridge Cleaver and Huey Newton eventually had a disagreement over the necessity of armed struggle as a response to COINTELPRO and other actions by the government against the Black Panthers and other radical groups, which led to Cleaver's eventual expulsion from the BPP. Also Cleaver's interest in North Korea and global anti-imperialist struggle drew ire from other BPP members who felt that he was neglecting the needs of African-Americans at home in the US. Following his expulsion from the Black Panthers in 1971, the group's ties with North Korea were quickly forgotten. 

Cleaver advocated the escalation of armed resistance into urban guerrilla warfare, while Newton suggested the best way to respond was to put down the gun, which he felt alienated the Panthers from the rest of the black community, and focus on more pragmatic reformist activity by lobbying for increased social programs to aid African-American communities and anti-discrimination laws. Cleaver accused Newton of being an Uncle Tom for choosing to cooperate with white interests rather than overthrow them.

Cleaver left Algeria in 1972, moving to Paris, France, becoming a born again Christian during time in isolation living underground. He turned his hand to fashion design; three years later, he released codpiece-revival "virility pants" he called "the Cleavers", enthusing that they would give men "a chance to assert their masculinity".
Cleaver returned to the United States in 1975 to face the unresolved attempted murder charge. 

By September 1978, on bail as the proceedings dragged on, he had incorporated Eldridge Cleaver Ltd, running a factory and West Hollywood shop exploiting his "Cleavers", which he claimed liberated men from "penis binding". He saw no conflict between this and his newfound Christianity, drawing support for his overtly sexual design from 22 Deuteronomy. The long-outstanding charge was subsequently resolved on a plea bargain reducing it to assault. A sentence of 1,200 hours' community service was imposed.

Later life
In the early 1980s, Cleaver became disillusioned with what he saw as the commercial nature of evangelical Christianity and examined alternatives, including Sun Myung Moon's campus ministry organization CARP. He was also Catholic for a time. He later led a short-lived revivalist ministry called Eldridge Cleaver Crusades, "a hybrid synthesis of Islam and Christianity he called 'Christlam'", along with an auxiliary called the "Guardians of the Sperm".

Cleaver was then baptized into the Church of Jesus Christ of Latter-day Saints (LDS Church) on December 11, 1983. He periodically attended regular services and lectured by invitation at LDS gatherings.

By the 1980s, Cleaver had become a conservative Republican. He appeared at various Republican events and spoke at a California Republican State Central Committee meeting regarding his political transformation. In 1984, he ran for election to the Berkeley City Council but lost. Undaunted, he promoted his candidacy in the Republican Party primary for the 1986 Senate race but was again defeated. The next year, his 20-year marriage to Kathleen Neal Cleaver came to an end.

In 1988, Cleaver was placed on probation for burglary and was briefly jailed later in the year after testing positive for cocaine. He entered drug rehabilitation for a stated crack cocaine addiction two years later, but was arrested for possession by Oakland and Berkeley police in 1992 and 1994. Shortly after his final arrest, he moved to Southern California, falling into poor health.

Death
Cleaver died at age 62 on May 1, 1998, at Pomona Valley Hospital Medical Center in Pomona, California. He is buried at Mountain View Cemetery in Altadena, California.

Soul on Ice (1968)

 
While in prison, he wrote a number of philosophical and political essays, first published in Ramparts magazine and then in book form as Soul on Ice. In the essays, Cleaver traces his own development from a "supermasculine menial" to a radical black liberationist, and his essays became highly influential in the black power movement.

In the most controversial part of the book, Cleaver acknowledges committing acts of rape, stating that he initially raped black women in the ghetto "for practice" and then embarked on the serial rape of white women. He described these crimes as politically inspired, motivated by a genuine conviction that the rape of white women was "an insurrectionary act". When he began writing Soul on Ice, he unequivocally renounced rape and all his previous reasoning about it.

The essays in Soul on Ice are divided into four thematic sections: "Letters from Prison", describing Cleaver's experiences with and thoughts on crime and prisons; "Blood of the Beast", discussing race relations and promoting black liberation ideology; "Prelude to Love – Three Letters", love letters written to Cleaver's attorney, Beverly Axelrod; and "White Woman, Black Man", on gender relations, black masculinity, and sexuality.

Books

References

Further reading
 Rout, Kathleen (1991). Eldridge Cleaver. Boston: Twayne Publ. .

Documentaries
 The Black Panthers: Vanguard of the Revolution, a documentary about the Black Panther Party released in 2015.

External links

 "Cleaver, Eldridge", The Columbia Encyclopedia, 6th edition, 2001–2007
 "From Muslim to Mormon: Eldridge Cleaver's Rhetorical Crusade"
 "Guide to the Eldridge Cleaver Papers" at The Bancroft Library
 Interview with Eldridge Cleaver on Frontline, PBS 
 Interview with Eldridge Cleaver in Reason magazine 

 
 

1935 births
1998 deaths
African-American writers
African-American candidates for President of the United States
Latter Day Saints from California
American people convicted of assault
American prisoners and detainees
American rapists
American male non-fiction writers
California Republicans
Deaths from cancer in California
Former Marxists
COINTELPRO targets
Converts to Mormonism
Deaths from prostate cancer
American expatriates in Algeria
Members of the Black Panther Party
Peace and Freedom Party presidential nominees
People from Jefferson County, Arkansas
Writers from Los Angeles
Prisoners and detainees of California
Candidates in the 1968 United States presidential election
20th-century American politicians
African-American Latter Day Saints
Activists from California
20th-century American essayists